Calma is a genus of marine nudibranch in the family Calmidae.

Species
Species in the genus Calma include:
 Calma glaucoides (Alder & Hancock, 1854)
 Calma gobioophaga Calado & Urgorri, 2002

References

 Gofas, S.; Le Renard, J.; Bouchet, P. (2001). Mollusca. in: Costello, M.J. et al. (Ed.) (2001). European register of marine species: a check-list of the marine species in Europe and a bibliography of guides to their identification. Collection Patrimoines Naturels. 50: pp. 180–213.

Calmidae